The Los Angeles National Cemetery is a United States National Cemetery in the Sawtelle unincorporated community of the West Los Angeles neighborhood in Los Angeles County, California.

Geography
The entrance to the cemetery is located at 950 South Sepulveda Boulevard (90049) at Constitution Avenue, near the intersection of Sepulveda Boulevard and Wilshire Boulevard. It is adjacent to Westwood, Los Angeles and UCLA along the east across Veteran Avenue, and the main Sawtelle Veterans Home campus across the San Diego Freeway (405) along the west. The cemetery was dedicated on May 22, 1889. It is directly connected to the central Veterans Home facilities by Constitution Avenue's underpass below freeway.

Cemetery
Interred on its  are war veterans, from the:
 Mexican–American War
 Civil War
 Spanish–American War
 World War I
 World War II
 Korean War
 Vietnam War
 Iraq War
 War in Afghanistan

An annual ceremony commemorating the birthday of Abraham Lincoln is held at the cemetery on or near February 12. The cemetery's annual Memorial Day program draws several thousand attendees each year.

The chapel at the cemetery was renamed the Bob Hope Veterans Chapel on 29 May 2002, Bob Hope's 99th birthday, in "celebration of his lifelong service to our American Veterans."

Notable burials

Medal of Honor recipients
Fourteen Medal of Honor recipients are buried at the cemetery:
 Sergeant First Class (then Sergeant) Chris Carr (medal awarded under name of Christos H. Karaberis), (World War II), US Army, Company L, 337th Infantry, 85th Infantry Division. Guignola, Italy, October 1–2, 1944
 Sergeant George H. Eldridge, (Indian Campaigns) US Army, Company C, 6th US Cavalry. Wichita River, Texas, July 12, 1870
 Sergeant Harry Harvey (also known as Harry Huckman), (Spanish American War) US Marine Corps, April 5, 1929
 Sergeant (then Corporal) Luther Kaltenbach, (Civil War) US Army, Company F, 12 Iowa Infantry. Nashville, Tennessee, December 16, 1864
 Landsman William F. Lukes (Korean Campaign of 1871) US Navy, Company D. Korean Forts, June 9–10, 1871
 Color Sergeant George McKee, (Civil War), US Army, Company D, 89th New York Infantry. Petersburg, Virginia, April 2, 1865
 Sergeant (then Private) Edward Murphy, (Indian Campaigns) US Army, Company G, 1st US Cavalry. Chiricahua Mountains, Arizona Territory, October 20, 1869
 Corporal Edwin Phoenix, (Indian Campaigns) US Army, Company E, 4th US Cavalry. Red River Texas, September 26–28, 1875
 Farrier Samuel Porter, (Indian Campaigns) US Army, Company L, 6th US Cavalry. Wichita River, Texas, July 12, 1870
 Private Charles W. Rundle, (Civil War) US Army, Company A, 116th Illinois Infantry. Vicksburg, Mississippi, May 22, 1863
 Wagoner Griffin Seward, (Indian Campaigns) US Army, Company G, 8th US Cavalry. Chiricahua Mountains, Arizona Territory, October 20, 1869
 Coxswain Timothy Sullivan, (Civil War) US Navy, USS Louisville. Battles in Arkansas, Tennessee and Mississippi, unknown date of action
 Corporal (then Private) James Sweeney, (Civil War) US Army, Company A, 1st Vermont Cavalry. Cedar Creek, Virginia, October 19, 1864
 Private Robert H. Von Schlick (China Relief Expedition, Boxer Rebellion) US Army, Infantry, Company C, 9th US Infantry. Tientsin, China, July 13, 1900

Other veterans

 More than one hundred Buffalo Soldiers are interred at the Los Angeles National Cemetery. These African American soldiers were members of the 9th, 10th, 24th, and 25th Cavalry during the American Civil War
 Paul Brinegar (1917–1995). Actor, World War II US Navy Chief Radioman
 Richard Carlson (1912–1977). Actor, married to Mona
 Royal Dano (1922–1994). Actor, US Army Sergeant
 Jack Dougherty (1895–1938). Actor, married to Barbara La Marr
 Nicholas Porter Earp (1813–1907). Father of Wyatt Earp
 Russell Hicks (1895–1957). Actor, US Army First Lieutenant
 Lawson Harris (1897–1948). Actor, director, producer, and writer. Father of John Derek
 Richard H. Kline (1926–2018). Cinematographer, US Navy
 Dean Paul Martin (1951–1987). US Air Force, Captain, F-4 Phantom Fighter pilot. Son of Dean Martin, killed when his jet crashed during a storm
 Howard McNear (1905–1969). Actor, Played Floyd the Barber on the Andy Griffith Show.  US Army Private, World War II
 Don Newcombe (1926–2019). Major League Baseball player, US Army
 Donald Prell (1924–2020). Venture capitalist, Infantry officer in WWII (wounded and captured in the Battle of the Bulge).
 Henry Rowland (1913–1984). Actor, US Army Corporal
 John Russell (1921–1991). Actor, US Marine Corps 2nd Lieutenant, World War Two, veteran of Guadalcanal Campaign.
 Paul C. Vogel (1899–1975) Cinematographer. US Army Captain. WWI and WWII. Oscar-winner for cinematography - "Battleground" 1949. 
 James R. Webb (1909–1994). Screenwriter
 Grant Williams (1931–1985). Actor who played The Incredible Shrinking Man, US Air Force
 The cemetery contains two British Commonwealth war graves from World War II, a Leading Aircraftman of the Royal Australian Air Force and a Captain of the Royal Canadian Artillery
 Two service dogs were buried in the mid 1940s, however, this practice is no longer permitted. Bonus was a service dog at the Sawtelle Soldiers Home and Blackout was a sentry dog that sustained wounds in the Pacific

Future burials
Los Angeles National Cemetery has been closed to new interments since approximately 1978, with the exception of spouses of those already buried. To accommodate community need,  the Department of Veterans Affairs acquired another  to permit the cemetery to expand. Future interments will be in urns of cremated ashes placed in columbarium walls built on the new land.  By eliminating ground burials, the new acreage will permit about as many new interments as are in the existing .

In 2017, Los Angeles National Cemetery began construction on the first phase of the columbarium on Constitution Avenue, west of I-405 just  from the main cemetery entrance. The cemetery will construct additional niches on the site as needed until it reaches the planned capacity of 90,854.

References

External links
 US Department of Veterans Affairs.gov: Los Angeles National Cemetery
 Interment.net: Los Angeles National Cemetery List of Burials
 
 
 

L
01
United States national cemeteries
Landmarks in Los Angeles
Sawtelle, Los Angeles
Sepulveda Boulevard
West Los Angeles
Wilshire Boulevard
Commonwealth War Graves Commission cemeteries in the United States
1889 establishments in California
Protected areas established in 1889
Historic American Buildings Survey in California
19th century in Los Angeles